The Paul Bunge Prize is an international award for seminal and lasting contributions to the history of scientific instruments. Endowed in 1993 by the late Hans R. Jenemann (1920–1996), glass chemist at Schott AG in Mainz, and collector and historian of antique chemical balances. The name of the prize commemorates the leading German maker of precision balances in the nineteenth century Paul Bunge (1839–1888). The Prize is given by the Hans R. Jenemann Foundation and jointly administered by the German Chemical Society and the Deutsche Bunsen-Gesellschaft für Physikalische Chemie.

Bunge Prize Laureates 
 2022 Matthew L. Jones, New York, USA
 2021 Liba Taub, Cambridge, UKNewnham College University of Cambridge news (11 May 2021)
 2020 Simon Werrett, London, UK
 2019 Sara J. Schechner, Cambridge, MA
 2018 Anthony John Turner, Le Mesnil-le-Roi, France
 2017 Simon Schaffer, Cambridge, UK
 2016 Robert G. W. Anderson, Cambridge, UK
 2015 Brian Gee (posthumously), Chelsea, UK
 2014 Cyrus C. M. Mody, Houston, TX
 2013 Marco Beretta, Bologna, Italy
 2012 David Pantalony, Ottawa, Canada
 2011 Matteo Valleriani, Berlin, Germany
 2010 Henning Schmidgen, Weimar, Germany
 2009 Jutta Schickore, Bloomington, IN
 2008 Alison Morrison-Low, Edinburgh, UK
 2007 Charlotte Bigg, Berlin, Germany
 2006 Davis Baird, Columbia, SC; Inge Keil, Augsburg, Germany
 2005 Myles W. Jackson, Salem, OR
 2004 Jobst Broelmann, Munich, Germany; Carsten Reinhardt, Regensburg, Germany
 2003 Sean F. Johnston, Glasgow, UK
 2002 Paolo Brenni, Florence, Italy
 2001 Jim Bennett, Oxford, UK
 2000 Alan Q. Morton, London, UK; Richard J. Sorrenson, Bloominton, IN
 1999 Nicolas Rasmussen, Sydney, Australia
 1998 Robert Bud, London, UK; Deborah J. Warner, Washington, DC
 1997 Silvio A. Bedini, Washington, DC
 1996 David A. King, Frankfurt/Main, Germany
 1995 Gerald L'Estrange Turner, Oxford, UK
 1994 Otto Sibum, Cambridge, UK; Matthias Dörries, Munich, Germany
 1992–1993 Klaus Hentschel, Hamburg, Germany; Mara Miniati, Florence, Italy

References

External links 
 Foundation Flyer (in German)
 Jenemann Archive Project

History of science
History of science and technology
History of science awards
History of science award winners
Historians of science